François Varillon (1905–1978) was a French Jesuit and theologian. He was also a writer of some significance. He entered the Society of Jesus, as a novitiate, at 22 and was ordained in 1937. He won the Grand prix catholique de littérature in 1974 for L’humilité de Dieu.

1905 births
1978 deaths
20th-century French Jesuits
20th-century French Catholic theologians
French Roman Catholic writers